Karmir Aghek is a village in the Lori Province of Armenia.

References 

Populated places in Lori Province